The Way to the Light is a 1923 German silent film directed by Géza von Bolváry and Kurt Rosen.

It was shot at the Emelka Studios in Munich. The film's sets were designed by the art director Willy Reiber.

Cast
In alphabetical order

References

External links

1923 films
Films of the Weimar Republic
Films directed by Géza von Bolváry
German silent feature films
German black-and-white films
Bavaria Film films
Films shot at Bavaria Studios